Nutcase or nut case is a slang term for an odd person. It may refer to:

 Nutcase (film), a 1980 New Zealand film
 Nutcase, an occasional member of the Australian electronic music group Itch-E and Scratch-E
 "Nutcase", a song by British punk rock band Leatherface from the 2010 album The Stormy Petrel
 Nutcase, a 2017 novel by British author Tony Williams
 Nutcase, a 2009 novel by American author Charlotte Hughes
 Nutcase Helmets, an American bicycle helmet company
 Cast Nutcase, a puzzle toy designed and produced by Hanayama

See also
 Nutter (disambiguation)
 Nut job (disambiguation)
 Nut (disambiguation)